Nicholas Paul Hasluck AM (born 17 October 1942) is an Australian novelist, poet, short story writer, and former judge.

Early life
Nicholas Hasluck was born in Canberra.  His father, Sir Paul Hasluck was a minister in the Federal Government under Robert Menzies, and was later appointed Governor-General of Australia.  Nicholas went to school at Scotch College, Perth, and Canberra Grammar School, before  studying law at University of Western Australia (1963) and Oxford (1966). After completing his studies he worked briefly in Fleet Street in London as an editorial assistant before returning to Australia in 1967 to work as a solicitor, initially in partnership with Robert Holmes à Court. He was a partner in the law firm Keall Brinsden from 1971 to 1984. While working as a barrister from 1985 to 2000 he was appointed Queen's Counsel in 1988 and served as part-time President of the Equal Opportunity Tribunal (WA). He was deputy chair of the Australia Council from 1978 to 1982 and was made a Member of the Order of Australia (AM). He served as Chair of the Literature Board from 1998 to 2001 and as Chair of the Art Gallery of Western Australia from 2014 to 2018.

Judicial career
On 1 May 2000, Hasluck was appointed a judge on the Supreme Court of Western Australia, which is the highest ranking court in the State of Western Australia. He retired as a judge on 5 May 2010.

Writing career
Hasluck started writing at school, producing poetry and essays for the school magazine and was first professionally published in 1964 with a poem appearing in Westerly literary magazine.

Hasluck's books fall into two categories, which he describes as 'moral thriller genre and satire', with the thriller interesting him the most. He cites the American writers William Faulkner, Saul Bellow, Norman Mailer and Gore Vidal as his main literary influences.

In 2006, Hasluck became Chairperson of the Commonwealth Writers' Prize. He completed his term in 2011.

Awards

 1984 - winner The Age Book of the Year Award Imaginative Writing Prize and Book of the Year The Bellarmine Jug
 1987 - shortlisted Miles Franklin Award for Truant State
 1991 - shortlisted Miles Franklin Award for The Country Without Music
 1991 - joint winner Western Australian Premier's Book Awards for The Country Without Music
 1999 - shortlisted Western Australian Premier's Book Awards for Our Man K

Bibliography

Novels

 
 The Blue Guitar (1980)
 The Hand That Feeds You (1982)
 The Bellarmine Jug (1984)
 Truant State (1987)
 The Country Without Music (1990)
 The Blosseville File (1992)
 A Grain of Truth (1994)
 Our Man K (1999)
 Dismissal (2011)
 Rooms in the City (2014)
 The Bradshaw Case (2016)

Short story collections

 The Hat on the Letter 'O' and Other Stories (1978; revised edition 1990)
 Wobbling the Whiteboard (under the pseudonym "Kim Lee") (2003)

Poetry

 Anchor and Other Poems (1976)
 On the Edge (1981)
 A Dream Divided (2004)

Non-fiction

 Chinese Journey (1985) (with Christopher Koch)
 Collage: Recollections and Images of the University of Western Australia (1987), essays
 Offcuts From a Legal Literary Life (1993), essays
 The Legal Labyrinth (2003)
 The Hasluck Banner  (2006)
 Somewhere in the Atlas: The Road to Khe Sanh and Other Travel Pieces (2007)
  Legal Limits (2013)
  Jigsaw: Patterns in law and literature (2018)
Beyond the Equator: An Australian Memoir (2019)
 Rollo's Way (2020)

Plays

 Van M (1990)

Articles

References

References
Baker, Candida (1986) Yacker: Australian writers talk about their work, Sydney, Picador
Daniel, Helen (1988) Liars: Australian New Novelists, Melbourne, Penguin

See also

 Judiciary of Australia

1942 births
Living people
20th-century Australian novelists
21st-century Australian novelists
Australian male novelists
Australian poets
Australian people of English descent
Australian male short story writers
Members of the Order of Australia
Judges of the Supreme Court of Western Australia
Australian male poets
20th-century Australian short story writers
21st-century Australian short story writers
20th-century Australian male writers
21st-century Australian male writers
Australian memoirists
Quadrant (magazine) people
People educated at Canberra Grammar School
Australian King's Counsel